The Diam Diam Era Two (Chinese: 我们的故事之沉默的年代2) is a 2021 Singaporean comedy drama film directed by Jack Neo. Continuing the story of the Lim family, set in 1988 election year, it tells the story as Ah Kun, Osman and Shamugam form a seemingly funny but serious opposition party C.M.I, and compete in the fierce election showdown.

The film stars veteran local comedy actors Mark Lee, Henry Thia and Wang Lei. It is released on 11 February 2021 during the Chinese New Year in Singaporean cinemas.

Other ensemble cast includes Suhaimi Yusof, Silvarajoo Prakasam, Richie Koh, Meixin Macy, Danny Lee, Benjamin Josiah Tan, Yap Hui Xin, Regina Lim, Ryan Lian, Tasha Low, Charmaine Sei and others.

The film is the only local Singaporean film releasing during the 2021 Chinese New Year. It is the fourth film in the Long Long Time Ago film series, after Long Long Time Ago (2016), Long Long Time Ago 2 (2016), and The Diam Diam Era (2020).

Synopsis 
Continuing from The Diam Diam Era, the fourth film is set in 1988 general election year, as Lim Ah Kun (Mark Lee) become dissatisfied with the government policies, he decides to form a new opposition party. In order to compete for seats in the GRC where he lives, Ah Kun teams up with Osman (Suhaimi Yusof) and Sharmugam (Silvarajoo Prakasam) to form a new opposition party named C.M.I, in order to contest in the general election. As the campaign gets more intense and the election day approaching, how will everyone and their families' story goes?

Cast

Production 
The film continues the series in showcasing Singapore's multicultural society, and its history from its founding to becoming an advanced country.

The third and fourth film are set in the 1980s, and touch on politically sensitive topics, such as several major policy changes implemented in the era, opposition parties, and the details of 1980s general election and campaigning.

Regarding the subject matter, Jack Neo states that: “Although the subject is sensitive, it is part of history. It should be viewed with a correct attitude. Singaporeans should understand the history of their own country. We are not trying to deliberately touch on sensitive subjects, instead we just do not want to hide what happened in history."

Release 
The previous film The Diam Diam Era was released in November 2020.

Meanwhile, this film is being released on 11 February 2021 in Singaporean cinema during the Chinese New Year.

References

External links
 Find cinema locations and complete timetable: Singapore
 

2021 films
Singaporean comedy-drama films
Hokkien-language films
2020s Mandarin-language films
Malay-language films
2020s English-language films
Films shot in Singapore
Films set in Singapore
Films directed by Jack Neo
Singaporean multilingual films
2021 comedy-drama films
2021 multilingual films